Ab Sarduiyeh (also Romanized as Āb Sardū’īyeh; also known as Āb Sardū’īyeh-ye Jamāl) is a village in Mardehek Rural District, Jebalbarez-e Jonubi District, Anbarabad County, Kerman Province, Iran. At the 2006 census, its population was 69, in 18 families.

References 

Populated places in Anbarabad County